The 2002 FIVB Volleyball World League was the 13th edition of the annual men's international volleyball tournament, played by 16 countries from 27 June to 18 August 2002. The Final Round was held in Belo Horizonte (Main) and Recife (Sub), Brazil.

Pools composition

Intercontinental round
The top two teams in each pool will qualify for the Final Round. If the Final Round hosts Brazil finish lower than second in their pool, they will still qualify along with the best three second teams across all four pools.

Pool A

|}

|}

Pool B

|}

|}

Pool C

|}

|}

Pool D

|}

|}

Final round
All times are Brasília Official Time (UTC−03:00).

Pool play

Pool E
Venue:  Ginásio de Esportes Geraldo Magalhães, Recife, Brazil

|}

|}

Pool F
Venue:  Mineirinho Arena, Belo Horizonte, Brazil

|}

|}

Final four
Venue:  Mineirinho Arena, Belo Horizonte, Brazil

Semifinals

|}

3rd place match

|}

Final

|}

Final standing

Awards
Best Scorer (Most Valuable Player)
  Ivan Miljković
Best Spiker
  Pavel Abramov
Best Blocker
  Aleksey Kuleshov
Best Server
  Vadim Khamuttskikh

References

External links
Official website

FIVB Volleyball World League
FIVB World League
Volleyball
2002 in Brazilian sport